Gertrude Flynn (January 14, 1909 – October 16, 1996) was an American stage, film and television actress. She was married to Asa Bordages, a feature writer for the New York World-Telegram and playwright known for the 1941 play Brooklyn USA.

Career

Flynn's film and television career began in 1954 in The Barefoot Contessa as "Lulu McGee". She played "Maggie Blake" in the Sherlock Holmes episode, "The Case of the Belligerent Ghost".

She made four guest appearances on Perry Mason in the early 1960s, including as "Agatha Culpepper" in "The Case of the Floating Stones", as Mrs. Nichols in "The Case of the Irate Inventor" in 1960, and as Sylvia Lambert in the 1963 episode "The Case of the Bluffing Blast".

Her final appearance was in 1966 in the "Case of the Golfer's Gambit" as Rolasie Hedrick. During the 1965–66 season of the soap opera Days of Our Lives she made five appearances as Anna Sawyer. She made her final television appearances in 1987 in Outlaws.

Theater
Flynn performed on Broadway beginning in the late 1920s. She appeared on stage through 1952 in the following productions, the most successful of which ran for three months:
 The Unsophisticates (December 30, 1929-January 1930) as Phyllis
 Penal Law 2010 (April 18, 1930-May 1930) as Lucy Van Dam
 Gasoline Gypsies (June 1931-June 1931) as Ruth Warren
 Three Times the Hour (August 25, 1931-September 1931) as Hildah Lovering
 The Moon in the Yellow River (February 29, 1932-April 1932) as Blanaid
 American Dream (February 21, 1933-March 1933) as Celia, Amarylils
 Man Bites Dog (April 25, 1933-May 1933) as Helen Lee
 Biography (February 1934-February 1934) as Slade Kinnicott
 Jigsaw (April 30, 1934-June 1934) as Julie
 A Sleeping Clergyman (October 8, 1934 - November  1934) as Cousin Minnie
 Mother Lode (December 1934-December 1934) as Julia Musette
 Noah (February 13, 1935-March 1935) as Ada
 One Good Year (November 27, 1935 - June 1936) as Anne
 The Puritan (January 1936-January 1936) as Kitty
 Marching Song (February 17, 1937-April 1937) as Rose Graham
 Romantic Mr. Dickens (December 2, 1940 – December 7, 1940) as Dora Spenlow (Later Dora Winter)
 The Distant City (September 22, 1941 – September 23, 1941) as Edna Scott
 The Grass Harp (March 27, 1952 – April 26, 1952) as The Baker's Wife

Despite the brief length of the stage productions, Flynn garnered some good reviews. The New York Times noted her appearance in the very short-lived (5 days) 1940 production of Romantic Mr. Dickens, a drama about the romances of Charles Dickens, and wrote that she "fit smoothly into this rather unorthodox picture of a literary tradition." After beginning her work in film and television, Flynn continued work in theater, making appearances in such as Summer Voices at the Circle Theater in Los Angeles as late as 1977.

Of her 1965 performance in the West Coast Repertory Company's troubled production of Long Day's Journey Into Night, the Los Angeles Times wrote "The one saving grace of the evening was the fine performance by Gertrude Flynn of Mary Tyrone".

Film and television
Flyn appeared in I Want To Live, Invitation to a Gunfighter and Rome Adventure. She guest starred on such television series as The Millionaire,  Alfred Hitchcock Presents, The Alfred Hitchcock Hour, The Loretta Young Show, Maverick, Have Gun - Will Travel, Dr Kildare, Perry Mason, Gunsmoke, Hawaii Five-O, Charlie's Angels, The Love Boat, and Hill Street Blues. Flynn appeared in the classic 1961 Twilight Zone episode, "Will the Real Martian Please Stand Up?". She played as Rose Kramer.

Partial filmography

Film
 The Barefoot Contessa (1954) as Lulu McGee
 War and Peace (1956) as Mariya Peronskaya
 Difendo il mio amore (1956)
 Boy on a Dolphin (1957) as Miss Dill
 The Love Specialist (1957)
 I Want to Live! (1958) as San Quentin Matron
 A Summer Place (1959) as Mrs. Carter, Helen's Mother (uncredited)
 Parrish (1961) as Miss Daly (uncredited)
 Rome Adventure (1962) as Mrs. Riggs
 The Thrill of It All (1963) as Celine (uncredited)
 Invitation to a Gunfighter (1964) as Hannah Guthrie
 Inside Daisy Clover (1965) as Daisy's Nurse (uncredited)
 Valley of the Dolls (1967) as Ladies' Room Attendant (uncredited)
 Blackbeard's Ghost (1968) as Mrs. Starkey (uncredited)
 Funny Girl (1968) as Mrs. O'Malley
 Bad Manners (1984) as Mother Celestina

Television

 Sherlock Holmes (1 episode, 1954) as Maggie Blake
 Conrad Nagel Theater (2 episodes, 1955)
 Douglas Fairbanks, Jr., Presents (1 episode, 1955) as Mary
 Peter Gunn (1 episode, 1959) as Mrs. 'J'
 Markham (1 episode, 1959) as Landlady
 The Lawless Years (2 episodes, 1959) as Jane Morrison
 The Millionaire (1 episode, 1960) as Martha Chambers
 Alfred Hitchcock Presents (2 episodes, 1959–1960) as Aunt Catherine
 General Electric Theater (1 episode, 1961) as Mrs. McQueen
 The Loretta Young Show (1 episode, 1961) as Lettie Harron
 The Law and Mr. Jones (1 episode, 1961) as Vera's Friend
 The Twilight Zone (1 episode, 1961) as Rose Kramer
 Maverick (3 episodes, 1959–1961) as Dorritt MacGregor
 Have Gun - Will Travel (1 episode, 1961) as Mona Lansing
 The Lawman (1 episode, 1962) as Miss Selma
 Hazel (1 episode, 1962) as Hilda
 Dr. Kildare (2 episodes, 1961–1963) as Eleanor Quayle
 The Farmer's Daughter (1 episode, 1965) as Mrs. Buchanan
 The Alfred Hitchcock Hour (3 episodes, 1963–1965) as Ethyl Chesterman
 Perry Mason (4 episodes, 1960–1966) as Agatha Culpepper
 Gunsmoke (3 episodes, 1959–1967) as Essie Benlan, Mrs. Blouze
 The F.B.I. (1 episode, 1968) as Ruth Kolner
 Hawaii Five-O (1 episode, 1968) as Landlady
 Medical Center (1 episode, 1970) as Mrs. Sorenson
 The Bold Ones: The New Doctors (1 episode, 1972) as Mrs. Ross
 Ladies of the Corridor (1975) as Mary Linscott
 Charlie's Angels (1 episode, 1976) as Grace Rodeheaver
 The Love Boat (1 episode, 1977) as Mrs. Pendleton
 The Tony Randall Show (2 episodes, 1976–1977) as Kim Reubner
 How the West Was Won (1978) as Clara
 Eight Is Enough (1 episode, 1979) as Mrs. Walker
 Three's Company (1 episode, 1982) as Mrs. Peabody
 Hill Street Blues (1 episode, 1984) as Mrs. Parsons
 Seduced (1985) as Mrs. Youngquist
 Something in Common (1986) as Aunt Celia
 Outlaws (1 episode, 1987) as Liz' Wade (final appearance)

References

External links
 
 
 

1909 births
1996 deaths
American film actresses
American television actresses
American stage actresses
Actresses from New York City
20th-century American actresses